Asoli  is a small village in Taluka Vengurla and district Sindhudurg of Maharashtra, India.

The Gram daivath (Village God) is Shree Dev Narayan.

Sindhudurg  is an administrative district in the state of Maharashtra  in India, which was carved out of the erstwhile Ratnagiri District. The district headquarters are located at Oros. The district occupies an area of 5207 km² and has a population of 868,825 of which 9.47% were urban (as of 2001).

Origin of name
Asoli near to Shiroda (Konkani-Shirodem, Marathi-Shiroda) is a small village in South Konkan (Maharashtra), just north of Goa, with a long stretch of clean sparkling mountains. It has a dense covering of palm trees. Shiroda and Aaravali are called Twin Cities (villages) and belong to Vengurla taluka in Sindhudurg district of Maharashtra, India. There are a lot of sightseeing places nearby Asoli Dev Narayan Temple, Dev Vetoba, Sateri Temple, Hanuman Temple, Navadurga and Mauli Temples at Redi, Mauli temple in Shiroda, Ganesh temple at Redi, Salt Pans. Shiroda Marketplace is famous.

Location: Mumbai 508 km, Panji 57 km 
Nearest Airport: Dabohli (Goa) 92 km 
Railway Station: Sawantwadi (K.R.)

The district is named after the fort of Sindhudurg (which means "fort in the sea"), which lies on a rocky island just off the coast of Malvan (मालवण).

Location
Sindhudurg is bordered on the north by Ratnagiri District, on the south by the state of Goa, on the west by the Arabian Sea, and to the east across the crest of the Western Ghats or Sayadhris is Kolhapur District. Sindhudurg is part of Konkan (coastal) region, a narrow coastal plain in western Maharashtra which lies between the Western Ghats and the Arabian Sea.
literacy in this district is around 80%.

Climate
Asoli has a semi-tropical climate and remains warm and humid in most of the year. It has three clear seasons: Rainy (June - October), winter (November-mid February) and Summer (mid-February–May). Temperatures vary between Max. 32 °C and monsoon winds bring heavy rains (average rainfall 3240.10  mm).

Major crops are = Rice, Mango, Cashewnut, Coconut, Vari, Nachani, Groundnut, Jackfruit, Beetlenut, and spices.
Sawantwadi is famous for its Wooden Toys, Narendra Hill, Moti lake & Amboli hill station (Hiranyakeshi & Nagartas waterfall). In & around Asoli, there are a lot many places to see like its clean & beautiful Seashore, Sagareshwar (Shiva)Temple, which is built in the Sands, Shri Mauli Devi Temple at Shiroda & Redi, Shri Navadurga Temple at Redi, Shri Ganesh Temple (with only two hands), Shri RamPurush Temple & Swayambhoo Shiva Temple at Redi . Also, Shri Vetoba & Shri Sateri Devi Temple at Aaravali-Shiroda, the Shiroda Seashore, and Shri Vetaleshwar Temple at Ajgaon are worth visiting among the others. Rameshwar (Shiva) Temple is the Gramdaivat of Vengurla. Also, there is a beautiful temple of Sateri Devi in Vengurla. Shiroda has a historic importance that the Salt Satyagraha of 1930 took place here. Salt is still produced here in plenty. The soil in this Konkan region is very different, with rich greenery everywhere and a pleasant atmosphere. Sindhudurg is famous for its beautiful beaches and foods.

People
The people of Asoli speak a distinct Konkani dialect Malvani, though Marathi and English are also spoken.

Cuisine
The cuisine of the district is popularly known as Malvani cuisine. Coconut, rice, and fish assume prime significance in the Malavani cuisine. Seafood containing fish, especially Bangada (mackerel) Paplet (Pomfret), Prawns, Bombil (Bombay Duck) and Tisrya (bivalve) is very popular. "Kombdi Vade", a chicken savory, is the most popular dish here. Others include Ukadya Tandulachi Pej (a semi-fluid boiled preparation made of brown-red rice variety) and Sol Kadhi (A preparation made of Sol (kokum) and coconut milk). Dry fish is also a local delicacy like "Golmo"(dried prawns).

Mango is a major factor in the life. Varieties of Alphonso Mango are particularly popular. Other varieties of mango: Mankur, Pāyari and Karel (used for preparing Mango Pickle) are also popular for their distinct taste.

The Malvani cuisine also has many vegetarian dishes, including garyache sandan, pickle of karmal, bimble, amba halad, karadichi bhakri, kanyacha sanja, appe, ghavan, dalimichi usual, and kaju usual.

Places of attraction
 Shree Dev Narayan Temple Asoli
 Vetoba Temple at Aravali
Tilari Dam (Dodamarg)
Ganapati Temple at Redi, Vengurla
  Navadurga Temple at Redi
 Navdurga Redi
 Tank beach
 Amboli, a waterfall
 Sindhudurg, a fort
 Vijaydurg, a fort

Beaches
 Redi
 Shiroda
 Asoli
 Tarkarli
 Malvan

Divisions
The 8 talukas of this district are Devgad, Kankavli, Malvan, Kudal, Savantwadi, Vengurla and Dodamarg and Vaibhavwadi.

There are 3 Vidhan Sabha constituencies in this district. These are Sawantwadi, Kudal and Kankavli. All of these are part of the Ratnagiri-Sindhudurg Lok Sabha constituency.

Notes

Sindhudurg district official website
 Sindhudurg Sightseeing
 Website of Vengurla
 Tourist information on Sindhudurg
 Tourists Information about malvan

Villages in Sindhudurg district